The Armenian Church is an Armenian Apostolic church located at 43 Egalității Street in Pitești, Romania. It is dedicated to John the Baptist.

Built in 1852, the church is trefoil in shape, with a hexagonal spire. It is listed as a historic monument by Romania's Ministry of Culture and Religious Affairs, as is its chancery, which dates to the same year.

Notes

Pitești
Historic monuments in Argeș County
Pitesti
Churches completed in 1852
1852 establishments in Wallachia
19th-century churches in Romania